Ciprian Perju (born 18 March 1996) is a Romanian professional footballer who plays as a defender for Unirea Slobozia.

References

External links
 
 

1996 births
Living people
Romanian footballers
Association football defenders
Liga I players
FC Viitorul Constanța players
Liga II players
FC Brașov (1936) players
LPS HD Clinceni players
CS Afumați players
FC Gloria Buzău players
AFC Unirea Slobozia players